The Alzey–Mainz railway was opened on 18 December 1871 by the Hessian Ludwig Railway, linking the two  cities of Alzey and Mainz in the German state of Rhineland-Palatinate to each other.

Route

The non-electrified line is operated by Regionalbahn service RB 31 and Regional-Express line RE 13.

It connects at Alzey with services on the Donnersberg Railway (Donnersbergbahn), operating as RB 47. The section between Alzey and Armsheim is also used by services on the Rheinhessen Railway from Bingen to Worms.

As the line from Armsheim to Mainz is single-track only, services can be operated at most every half-hour, with oncoming trains forced to wait in stations, usually in Saulheim and Mainz-Marienborn (RB) or Mainz-Gonsenheim (RE).

Rail services

The line is now served by Regionalbahn service RB 31 and Regional-Express service RE 13. Until the timetable change in December 2014, the line was operated by DB Regio, after which vlexx GmbH took over the service from Mainz to Kirchheimbolanden. The company had won the tender for the passenger operations.

The Elsass-Express (Alsace Express) to Wissembourg uses this part of the line on weekends and on public holidays.

Rolling stock

DB Regio
The track is served by both trains consisting of class 218 diesel locomotives hauling three double-decker carriages and by class 628 diesel multiple units, sometimes in coupled sets. In fact, class 629, a variation of class 628, was specially built for the very steeply graded line.

vlexx

vlexx GmbH has operated Alstom Coradia LINT diesel multiple unit since December 2014. Services are operated with LINT 54 as two-part diesel railcars with 162 seats or three-part diesel railcars with 264 seats.

References

External links 

 

Railway lines in Rhineland-Palatinate
Railway lines opened in 1871
1871 establishments in Germany
Rhenish Hesse
Alzey-Worms
Buildings and structures in Mainz-Bingen
Transport in Mainz